A tailless aircraft is one which has no separate horizontal stabilizer or control surface, either behind or in front of the main wing.

List of aircraft

|-
| Aériane Swift || US || Glider ||  || 1989 ||  || n/a || Foot-launched.
|-
| Aerospatiale-BAC Concorde || France & UK || Jet || Transport || 1969 || Production || 20 || SST.
|-
| AeroVironment Wasp III || US || Propeller || UAV || 2007 ||  || n/a || Date of service entry with USAF
|-
| Akaflieg München Mü5 Wastl || Germany || Glider || Experimental || 1929 || Prototype || 1 || 
|-
| Akaflieg Braunschweig SB-13 Arcus || Germany || Glider || Experimental || 1988 || Prototype || 1 || 
|-
| Antonov E-153 || USSR || Jet || Fighter || 1947 || Prototype || 1 ||
|-
| Arup S-1 || US || Propeller || Experimental || 1932 || Prototype || 1 || Rounded "heel wing".
|-
| Arup S-2 || US || Propeller || Experimental || 1933 || Prototype || 1 || Rounded "heel wing".
|-
| Arup S-3 || US || Propeller || Experimental || 1934 || Prototype || 1 || Rounded "heel wing".
|-
| Arup S-4 || US || Propeller || Experimental || 1935 || Prototype || 1 || Rounded "heel wing".
|-
| Avro 707 || UK || Jet || Experimental || 1949 || Prototype || 5 || Research for Avro Vulcan thick delta wing, 1/3 scale of Vulcan.
|-
| Avro CF-105 Arrow || Canada || Jet || Fighter || 1958 || Prototype || 5 || Supersonic.
|-
| Avro Vulcan || UK || Jet || Bomber || 1952 || Production || 136 || Subsonic.
|-
| BAC 221 || UK || Jet || Experimental || 1964 || Prototype || 2 || Ogee wing. Modified version of the Fairey Delta 2.
|-
|BAE Systems Corax|| UK || Jet || UAV || 2004 || Prototype || n/a ||
|-
| Baynes Bat || UK || Propeller || Transport || 1943 || Prototype || 1 || 
|-
| Boulton Paul P.111 || UK || Jet || Experimental || 1950 || Prototype || 1 || Delta wing. 
|-
| Chizhevski BOK-5 || USSR || Propeller || Private || 1937 || Prototype || 1 ||
|-
| Briffaud GB-6 || France || Propeller || Private || 1955 || Prototype || 1 || 
|-
| Brochocki BKB-1 || Canada || Glider || Private || 1959 || Prototype || 1 || 
|-
| Charpentier C1 || France || Propeller || Private || 1934 || Prototype || 1 || Trimotor.
|-
| Convair XF-92A || US || Jet || Fighter || 1948 || Prototype || 1 || 
|-
| Convair F2Y Sea Dart || US || Jet || Fighter || 1953 || Prototype || 5 || Supersonic flying boat.
|-
| Convair F-102 Delta Dagger || US || Jet || Fighter || 1953 || Production || 1,000 || Supersonic.
|-
| Convair F-106 Delta Dart || US || Jet || Fighter || 1956 || Production || 342 || Supersonic.
|-
| Convair B-58 Hustler || US || Jet || Bomber || 1956 || Production || 116 || Supersonic.
|-
| Dassault MD 550 Mystère-Delta || France || Jet || Fighter || 1955 || Prototype || n/a || In modified form renamed the Mirage I.
|-
| Dassault Mirage III || France || Jet || Fighter || 1956 || Production || 1,422 || Supersonic jet. Many derivatives.
|-
| de Havilland DH.108 Swallow || UK || Jet || Experimental || 1946 || Prototype || 3 || 
|-
| Douglas F4D Skyray || US || Jet || Fighter || 1951 || Operational || 422 || 
|-
| Dunne D.1 || UK || Glider || Experimental || 1907 || Prototype || 1 || Biplane. Failed to fly with pusher power module.
|-
| Dunne D.3 || UK || Glider || Experimental || 1908 || Prototype || 1 || Biplane.
|-
| Dunne D.4 || UK || Propeller || Experimental || 1908 || Prototype || 1 || Pusher biplane.
|-
| Dunne D.5 || UK || Propeller || Experimental || 1910 || Prototype || 1 || Pusher biplane.
|-
| Dunne D.6 || UK || Propeller || Experimental || 1910 || Prototype || 1 || Pusher. Failed.
|-
| Dunne D.7 || UK || Propeller || Experimental || 1911 || Prototype || 1 || Pusher.
|-
| Dunne D.8 || UK || Propeller || Experimental || 1911 || Operational || 2 || Pusher biplane.
|-
| EFW N-20 || Switzerland || Jet || Experimental || 1948 || Prototype || 3 || N-20.01 gilder, .02 Arbalète and .03 Aiguillon.
|-
| Fairey Delta 2 || UK || Jet || Experimental || 1954 || Prototype || 2 || First aircraft to exceed 1,000 miles per hour. Later modified as the BAC 221.
|-
| Fauvel AV.36 || France || Glider || Private || 1951 || Homebuild || 100+ || and others by Charles Fauvel.
|-
| FMA I.Ae 38 || Argentina || Propeller || Transport || 1960 || Prototype || 1 || Designed by Reimar Horten.
|-
| General Aircraft GAL.56 || UK || Glider || Experimental || 1944 || Prototype || 4 || 
|-
| General Dynamics F-16XL || US || Jet || Experimental || 1982 || Prototype || 2 || Cranked delta wing.
|-
| Gotha Go 147 || Germany || Propeller || Patrol || 1936 || Prototype || 1 || 
|-
| Granger Archaeopteryx || UK || Propeller || Private || 1930 || Prototype || 1 || 
|-
| Haig Minibat || US || Motor glider || Private || 1979 || Homebuild || 10+ || 
|-
| HAL Tejas || India || Jet || Fighter || 2001 || Production || 33 || 
|-
| Handley Page HP.75 Manx || UK || Propeller || Experimental || 1943 || Prototype || 1 || Pusher. 
|-
| Handley Page HP.115 || UK || Jet || Experimental || 1961 || Prototype || 1 || Sharply swept delta wing.
|-
| Hispano HA P-300 (HA-23P) || Spain || Glider || Experimental || 1959/60 || Prototype || 1 || Developed into the Egyptian Helwan HA-300 tailed jet.
|-
| Hoffman Flying Wing || US || Propeller || Experimental || 1934 || Prototype || 1 || Arup-type "heel wing".
|-
|Horten Aircraft HX-2 || Germany || Propeller || Experimental || 2018 || Prototype || n/a || 
|-
| I.Ae. 34 Clen Antú || Argentina || Glider ||  || 1949 ||  || 6 || Designed by Reimar Horten and manufactured by the FMA.
|-
| I.Ae. 41 Urubú || Argentina || Glider ||  || 1953 ||  || 5 || Designed by Reimar Horten in Argentina.
|-
| Interstate XBDR || US || Jet || UAV || 1944 || Project || 0 ||  TV-guided cruise missile.
|-
| Kalinin K-12 || USSR || Propeller || Experimental || 1936 || Prototype || 1 || 
|-
| Kasper Bekas || US || Glider || Experimental || 1968 || Prototype || 3 || 
|-
| Kimura/Kayaba HK-1 || Japan || Glider || Experimental || 1939 || Prototype || 1 || 
|-
| Kayaba Ku-2 || Japan || Glider || Experimental || 1940 || Prototype || 1 || 
|-
| Kayaba Ku-3 || Japan || Glider || Experimental || 1941 || Prototype || 1 || 
|-
| Kayaba Ku-4 || Japan || Propeller || Experimental || 1941 || Project || 0 || Cancelled before it flew.
|-
| Kollman Raptor || US ||  ||  || 1994 ||  || n/a || 
|-
| Lippisch delta || Germany || Propeller || Experimental || 1931-45 || Prototype || n/a || Several types.
|-
| Lockheed A-12 || US || Jet || Reconnaissance || 1962 || Production || n/a || Mach 3 capability. Long forward-fuselage chines. Several derivatives, especially the SR-71 Blackbird.
|-
| Lockheed Martin X-44 MANTA || US || Jet || Experimental || 2000 || Project || 0 || Multi-Axis No-Tail Aircraft.
|-
| Marske Monarch || US || Glider || Experimental || 1974 || Homebuild || n/a || 
|-
| Marske Pioneer || US || Glider || Experimental || 1968 || Homebuild || 17 || One example built of the Pioneer 1, at least 16 of the Pioneer II.
|-
| Marske XM-1 || US || Glider || Experimental || 1957 || Prototype || 1 || 
|-
| Messerschmitt Me 163 Komet || Germany || Rocket || Fighter || 1941 || Production || ~370 || 
|-
| Mitchell U-2 Superwing || US || Glider || Experimental || 1980 || Homebuild || n/a || 
|-
| John K. Moody/Larry Mauro Easy Riser || US || Propeller || Experimental || 1975 ||  || n/a || 
|-
| |Nike PUL 9 || Germany || Propeller || Experimental || 1990 || Prototype || 1 || 
|-
| Northrop X-4 Bantam || US || Jet || Fighter || 1948 || Prototype || 2 || 
|-
|Northrop Grumman RQ-180||US|| Jet || UAV || 2015 || Prototype || n/a || Stealth surveillance aircraft.
|-
| University of Pretoria Exulans || South Africa || Glider || Experimental || 1989 || Prototype || 2 || Exulans I and II. "Gull" variable-sweep wing.
|-
| Saab 35 Draken || Sweden || Jet || Fighter || 1955 || Production || 651 || Supersonic jet. Double-delta planform.
|-
| Short SB.1 || UK || Glider || Experimental || 1951 || Prototype || 1 || Aero-isoclinic wing.
|-
| Short SB.4 Sherpa || UK || Jet || Experimental || 1953 || Prototype || 1 || Aero-isoclinic wing.
|-
| Soldenhof So.A || Switzerland || Propeller || Private || 1930 || Prototype || 1 || Pusher.
|-
| Tupolev Tu-144 || USSR || Jet || Transport || 1968 || Operational || 16 || SST.
|-
| Vought F7U Cutlass || US || Jet || Multirole Fighter || 1948 || Operational || 320 || 
|-
| Westland-Hill Pterodactyl || UK || Propeller || Experimental || 1920s-1930s || Prototype || 3 || Series of types, 3 actually built.
|-
| Weltensegler || Germany || Glider || Private || 1921 || Prototype || 1 || 
|}

See also
 Blended wing body
 Flying wing

References

Lists of aircraft by wing configuration